Farewell, My Love is a 2001 action film by Randall Fontana starring Gabrielle Fitzpatrick, Phillip Rhys, and Robert Culp.

Movie Info
Fitzpatrick plays a kind avenging angel who takes revenge on a mob that killed her family. Robert Culp, Brion James, Phillip Rhys, and Mark Sheppard co-star in this action drama that contains a measure of violence and sex that would appeal to a certain audience.

Plot
A mysterious assassin named Brigit (Fitzpatrick) starts killing apparently unrelated Russian criminals. She befriends an old arm dealer Renault (James) who trains her and helps her. Brigit reveals that four of them; George (Mitchell), Natalya (Wynter), Sergei (Lauter) and Peter (Foster) invaded her home when she was a teen, killed her father by shooting him, gang-raped and then kill her mother and molested and wounded her leaving her for dead. However she survived and swore revenge. Peter, been the last of the original four to still be alive, manages to ambush her and kills Renault. She joins forces with Renault's son Luc and after some double crossing both her and Luc avenge their parents killing Peter.

Cast
 Gabrielle Fitzpatrick as Brigit
Kimberlee Peterson as Young Brigit
 Phillip Rhys as Luc
 Robert Culp as Michael Reilly
 Ed Lauter as Sergei Karpov 
 Adam Baldwin as Jimmy, The Bartender 
 Brion James as Renault
 Stephen Gregory Foster as Peter
 Sarah Wynter as Natalya 
 Hamilton Mitchell as George Karpov
 Constance Zimmer as Kyle
 Mark Sheppard as M.J.
 Craig Aldrich as Paddy
 Jim Landis as Doctor
 Jane Fontana as Club Singer
 Catherine McGoohan as Mrs. Fauve
 Genevieve Maylam as Julie
 Lorielle New as Dahra
 Samantha Lemole as Amy
 Chris Byrne as Chino
 Ron Althoff as Bouncer #1 
 Warren A. Stevens as Bouncer #2
 Chuck Hicks as Bouncer #3
 Buckley Norris as Drunk
 Trevor Coppola as Phil Conway

Technical
 Direct to Video

References

External links
 

2001 films
American action thriller films
American crime thriller films
2001 action thriller films
2001 crime thriller films
Girls with guns films
Films set in Los Angeles
Films scored by Michael Wandmacher
2000s English-language films
2000s American films